Loup Loup may refer to:

Loup Loup Pass, a mountain pass in Okanogan County, Washington
Loup Loup Ski Bowl, a ski area in Okanogan County
Loop Loop, Washington, a ghost town in Okanogan County also known as Loup Loup

See also
Loup (disambiguation)